This is a list of international presidential trips made by Gustavo Petro, the 34th and current President of Colombia. As of January 2023. National trips are not included. The number of visits per country where he travelled are:

2022

2023

See also
2022 Colombian presidential election
President of Colombia

References 

Presidency of Gustavo Petro
Foreign relations of Colombia
2022 in international relations
2023 in international relations
Gustavo Petro
Colombia diplomacy-related lists
Gustavo Petro